Haughey is an Irish surname of noble origins.  Spelling variations include: Hoey, McCaughey and McKeogh, among others. 

The Haugheys are descendants of the ancient Dál Fiatach dynasty, rulers of Ulaid. According to Irish tradition the Dál Fiatach descend from Fiatach Finn mac Dáire, an alleged King of Ulster and High King of Ireland in the 1st century AD. In addition to a number of Scottish clans, as well as the British royal family (through the House of Dunkeld), their lineage extends to the Darini/Dáirine.

Notable bearers of the surname include:

 Charles Haughey, Former Taoiseach (Prime Minister) of Ireland
 Chris Haughey, former Major League Baseball player
 Clare Haughey, MSP
 Denis Haughey, Former Minister and MEP
 Edward Haughey, Baron Ballyedmond
 Mary Haughey, Baroness Ballyedmond
 Matthew Haughey, American programmer, web designer, and blogger
 Maureen Haughey, wife of Charles Haughey
 Pádraig Haughey, Irish Gaelic footballer
 Seán Haughey, Former Lord Mayor of Dublin and Minister of State
 Siobhan Haughey, Hong Kong Olympic swimmer
 Hon. Thomas Haughey, Former U.S. Representative
 Tom Haughey, rugby league footballer
 Sir William Haughey, Baron Haughey 
 Seán Ó hEochaidh

See also
 Haughey (TV series), a series broadcast by RTÉ in 2005 about Charles Haughey
 Haughey's Fort
 Hoey
 McCaughey
 Kings of Ulster
 Dál Fiatach
 Ulaid
 Irish nobility
 Eochaid

References

External links
 Kingdom of Ulster

Surnames of Irish origin
Anglicised Irish-language surnames
Ulaid